Montreux Festival is a blues album by Albert King, Chico Hamilton and Little Milton, recorded live on July 1, 1973 at the Montreux Jazz Festival.

Track listing
"In View" (Barry Finnerty) – 12:20 - Chico Hamilton
"Let Me Down Easy" (Morris Dollison) – 6:35 - Little Milton
"We're Gonna Make It" (Gene Barge, Billy Davis, Raynard Miner, Carl Smith) – 3:17 - Little Milton
"Don't Make No Sense" (Carl Smith, E. Faulkner) – 7:06 - Albert King
"Stormy Monday" (Aaron Walker) – 5:27 - Albert King
"For the Love of a Woman" (Don Nix) – 4:27 - Albert King

Personnel
 Albert King – electric guitar, vocals
 Little Milton – guitar, vocals
 Donald Kinsey, Barry Finnerty, Jerome Hayes – guitar
 Rick Watson, Wayne Preston, John Polk – tenor saxophone
 Arnie Lawrence, Alex Foster – alto saxophone
 Norville Hodges, Wilbur Thompson, Herbert J. Williams – trumpet
 James Washington – organ
 Bill Rennie, Mike Richmond, Joe Turner – bass
 Sam King, Calep Emphery, Chico Hamilton – drums

References

Albert King live albums
1974 live albums
Stax Records live albums
albums recorded at the Montreux Jazz Festival